Levon Lachikyan (1955, September 7) is an Armenian art critic and graphic artist. He is the brother of artist Samvel Lajikian, who is an honoured artist of Armenia.

Biography 
In 1977 Levon Lachikyan graduated from the philological department of Yerevan State University (YSU) then completed his Ph.D. in Aesthetics at YSU in 1980. He has been a member of the RA Artists' Union since 2009 and a member of the RA Journalists' Union since 2005.

Between 1981 and 1996, Lachikyan lectured at Yerevan State University. From 1992 to 1994 he worked as an art columnist at the daily “AZG”. Starting in 1996 until 2011 he held the position of press secretary at the Fund for Armenian Relief.  Since 2012 he has been the Head of the Department of Armenian Communities of America at the RA Ministry of Diaspora. Since 2013 he has been a lecturer at his alma mater Yerevan State University. He has also previously lectured at the Komitas Yerevan Conservatory.

Lachikyan's scientific and art articles have been published in various Armenian and international journals (“Bazmavep,” Hantes amsorya etc.) and encyclopedias (“Christian Armenia Encyclopedia”)

Books 
 “Spiritual Tinklings of Dark Days”, (Arm.), Yerevan, 2004
 “The Wonderful Alphabet”, (Eng.) New York, 2005 
 “Ode to Armenian,” (Arm.),  Yerevan, 2005
 “Crossing Roads,” (Arm.) Yerevan, 2006
 “Crossing Roads,” (Eng.), Yerevan, 2012,
 ‘’My Armenia’’, (Arm.), Yerevan, 2015

Personal exhibitions 
 “Native lands”, Goris, July 2010
 “Crossing Roads”, Narekatsi Art Center, Yerevan, September 2010 
 “Gyumri, my Love”, Gyumri, December 2010,
 “Crossing Roads”, Educational-Culture Center “Espas,” Yerevan, July 2011
 “The Armenian World”, New York City, Kalustian Hall, December 2011 
 “Heritage without Borders”, The State Museum of Nature of Armenia, Yerevan, September 2013
 “Bolis Reflections”, Eurasia Partnership Foundation-Armenia, Yerevan, April 2015
 “Istanbul: So close and so far!”, Istanbul, Kinali Island,  July 2015

Awards 
In 2010 Lachikyan was awarded a Gold Medal of the RA Ministry of Culture, for his achievements in culture and art, as well as for designing the new series of Armenian postage stamps.

Quotes on Levon Lachikyan 
‘’I am immensely impressed by Levon Lachikyan’s drawings. They are elegant and sensitive works with the sense of space and fine composition.
It is of great importance that Levon’s drawings are not simple reproductions of the substance or mere documentation. Along with presenting the architectural details of various constructions he is able to abstract from them and manifest his individual attitude towards the matter’’.
Hagop Hagopian, Armenian prominent artist

“A lot of people have written about culture and a lot of them will still write. However, I strongly believe that not everyone should write about art and generally culture. Only those, who, firstly, love and then understand the art. Levon Lachikyan’s articles are marked by the synthesis of these two. As a result, the reader waits for his articles. An appraisal, considered the highest for any author”. 
Tigran Levonyan, RA National Artist

Gallery

References

Արտաքին հղումներ 
 Գյումրվա, Էրզրումի, Էրգրի և աշխարհի կարոտներ
  Police with its white and black
 Լեւոն Լաչիկեանի նոր ու վերապրեցնող արուեստը
 Քընալը կղզում Պոլսին նվիրված Լևոն Լաճիկյանի ցուցահանդեսը գրավել է նաև թուրք արվեստասերներին
 Պոլիսը մեզ ավելի մերձենալի դարձնել | լուսանկարներ - Հրապարակ
 Полис глазами Левона Лачикяна
 Լեւոն Լաճիկեան. «Պոլսոյ փողոցներով տիրոջ իրաւունքով կը քալէի»
 Levon Laçikyan Resim Sergisi
 Levon Lachikyan, Polis so close and far
 ՏՈՒՐԻԶՄԻ ԿԱՌԱՎԱՐՄԱՆ ԵՒ ՄՇԱԿՈՒԹԱԲԱՆՈՒԹՅԱՆ ԱՄԲԻՈՆԻ ԱՍԻՍՏԵՆՏ Լ.ԼԱՃԻԿՅԱՆԻ ՀՈԲԵԼՅԱՆԱԿԱՆ ՑՈՒՑԱՀԱՆԴԵՍԸ ՍՏԱՄԲՈՒԼՈՒՄ
 Levon Lachikyan's Polis
 Levon Lachikyan’s Constantinople
 Bridge- Levon Lachikyan

1955 births
People from Gyumri
Living people